= Compass Maps =

U.S. publisher of road maps

- Founded: 1963
- Founder: Dick and Shirley Elke
- Country of origin: United States
- Headquarters location: Modesto, California
- Publication types: maps
- Official website: www.compass-maps.com

Compass Maps was a U.S. publisher of road maps. It was based in Modesto, California.

It was founded in 1963 by Dick and Shirley Elke. They produced high quality maps of Northern and Southern California. They also did some maps of places in Nevada (Reno, Las Vegas), as well as Salt Lake City, Utah. In 2007, they had nearly 100 area maps that they produced. However, the company shut down in March 2008 for reorganization, then reopened in May of that same year, to only shut down, this time for good, in June 2008. They were located on 1172 Kansas Avenue in Modesto, just west of Highway 99.
